Stena Line Holland BV is a subsidiary of Stena Line that operates ferry routes between Harwich and Killingholme on the east coast of England and Hook of Holland and Europort in the Netherlands. The head office is in Hook of Holland in the Netherlands. Apart from during the two world wars there has been a continuous service operating between these two countries, initially by the railway companies serving the east coast of England together with Stoomvaart Maatschappij Zeeland a Dutch ferry company. In 1990 Stena Line had purchased both parts and Stena Line Holland BV came into being.

Hook of Holland – Harwich
A passenger service has operated from Harwich to Hook of Holland since the late 19th century apart from a break during the Second World War. Until 1990, the route was operated by two companies: one British and the other Dutch; but since then, Stena Line BV has been operating this route.

History of the route
In the late 19th century, the Great Eastern Railway (GER), wishing to compete with its rivals who were operating from the Kent coast to France and Belgium, obtained the rights to provide a cargo and cattle service to Rotterdam. After first using chartered tonnage they carried passengers with the paddle steamer Zealous 613 gt, built in 1864 on the Thames by J & W Dudgeon. Dudgeon also supplied the 1865 built Avalon, 670 gt, which was powered by a two-cylinder oscillating engine that gave a speed of 14 knots.

When the service first started, ships bound for Rotterdam had to negotiate the Brielle Bar to enter the river Maas with access possible only at high water. Things improved in 1872 with the opening of the New Waterway which by-passed the Brielle Bar. The Great Eastern paddle steamer, Richard Young, was the first seagoing vessel to use the direct link to the city.

In 1883, the Great Eastern Railway moved its English base from Harwich town to Parkeston Quay and in 1893 moved its Dutch operations from Rotterdam to the new rail terminus at the Hook of Holland. The first vessel to call at the "Hook" was the steamer Cambridge built in 1886 of 1,194 gt.

In 1893, the GER built the twin-screw Chelmsford to open a new night service. The new terminal in the Hook was situated on the north western end of the New Waterway and this saved two hours on the passage to Rotterdam itself. The new route enabled passengers to leave London in the evening and, after arrival in the Hook before 6 am, be in Amsterdam at breakfast time and reach Berlin by the end of the day.

The service quickly became popular, and GER used three ships to offer night sailings each way, every day except Saturday. By 1904, the GER had ceased operations to Rotterdam. The Dutch had their own services from Flushing, which was operated by Stoomvaart Maatschappij Zeeland (SMZ) which was created in 1875, which ran firstly to Queenborough near Sheerness and then to Folkestone.

On 1 January 1923 after the enforced re-grouping of the railway companies, the route came under the control of the London and North Eastern Railway.

In 1926, SMZ moved its English port to Harwich providing day sailings but did not start using the Hook of Holland until after the Second World War. After both World Wars, the Hook became a major port for troop movements, these operations continuing until 1961.

Post Second World War vessels on this route included the John Brown built Arnhem (1946). On 1 January 1948, after the nationalising of the British railway network, the route came under the control of British Railways. In 1950, the Amsterdam, also built by John Brown, came into service; in 1963, the elegant Avalon was built for this route. SMZ added the motor ship the Koningin Wilhelmina in 1960.

In 1968, the two Ro-Ro passenger vessels (the British-owned St George and the Dutch-owned Koningin Juliana) came into service, the St George in July and the Koningin Juliana in October. This fully integrated service was operated from November 1968 under the Sealink banner with each ship leaving port by day and returning overnight.

In 1984, Sealink was bought by Sea Containers who continued to operate the British operations under the Sealink name. In 1989, SMZ was acquired by Stena Line and in 1990 Stena bought Sealink, thus for the first time, the Dutch and British operations were under the same ownership.

Operation under Stena BV
In 1990, when Stena Line took control of the route, the Harwich to Hook of Holland service was being operated with two passenger and one freight Ro-Ro vessels. This continued until 2 June 1997, when with the introduction of the high speed ferry Stena Discovery, the two conventional ferries were taken off the route and an additional freight ferry was introduced.

Since 1996, Stena Line, in conjunction with Anglia Railways and its successors (currently Abellio Greater Anglia) in the United Kingdom and Nederlandse Spoorwegen, the Netherlands Railways, has been operating the integrated Dutchflyer service (named Go-London in the Netherlands), a rail/sea link between London and Amsterdam.

In June 2006, Stena Line announced that the high-speed catamaran ferry, would be withdrawn from service on 8 January 2007. It had been carrying the majority of the passenger traffic on the Hook of Holland–Harwich route. This service was halted due to the excessive cost of operating the ship and competition from the budget airlines. The ferry consumed 180,000 litres of high grade fuel daily whilst doing its four crossings at speeds of up to 45 knots, about 75 kilometres per hour.

After the Stena Discovery was removed from service on the Hook of Holland – Harwich route, she was laid up in Belfast. In 2010 she was sold to Venezuelan interests.

To replace the Stena Discovery, Stena Line invested 100 million euro in rebuilding the existing ferries of the route. The Ro-Pax vessels were both lengthened and converted at the Lloyd Werft shipyard in Bremerhaven so that they could carry additional passengers. Both ships are now 240 metres long, the Stena Britannica being lengthened by 28 metres and the Stena Hollandica by 52 metres. The Stena Britannica returned to service on 12 March 2007 and the Stena Hollandica on 14 May 2007.

In November 2006, Stena Line ordered two new vessels to be built at Aker Yards (now STX Europe) in Germany, to replace the Stena Britannica and Stena Hollandica.  These vessels, which are now in service, are the biggest in Stena Line's fleet so far. They were delivered in May and October 2010.

Ships that have operated between Harwich and Rotterdam or Hook of Holland

Ships of the Great Eastern Railway

Ships of the London and North Eastern Railway and British Railways

Ships operated by Zeeland Steamship Company (SMZ)

Ships operated by Stena Line BV

Hook of Holland – Killingholme

This route was inaugurated on 8 October 2000 using two old freight RoRo ferries, the Stena Searider, built in 1969, and the Stena Seatrader, built in 1973. The success of this route encouraged a further 200 million euro investment in two replacement ferries for this service. The first vessel, the Stena Trader replaced the Stena Seatrader and commenced operating on 12 August 2006 and the second vessel, the Stena Traveller went into service on 20 June 2007 replacing the Stena Searider.
On 21 May 2010 it was announced that the Stena Trader and Stena Traveller would leave on a five-year charter to the Canadian company, Marine Atlantic, to sail between Nova Scotia and Newfoundland. Two larger vessels, the Stena Transporter and Stena Transit had already been ordered from Samsung in South Korea as replacements, but would not be ready until 2011.  To cover the gap two vessels, the Finnarrow and the Coraggio, were chartered.  The first of the new vessels, the Stena Transporter, took over from the Finnarrow on 1 March 2011.  The second vessel, the Stena Transit, is due in October 2011.

Vessels that have operated on the Hook of Holland to Killingholme route

Rotterdam (Europoort) – Harwich
This route is descended from the Felixstowe to Europort route that was operated by Townsend Thoresen. In 1987 Townsend Thoresen were taken over by P&O Ferries who in turn sold the route in 2002 to Stena who then moved the British end of the operation to Harwich.

References

Ferry companies of the Netherlands
Ferry companies of England
Stena Line
Companies based in Rotterdam
Transport in Rotterdam